The Comedy of Charleroi is a 1934 short story collection by the French writer Pierre Drieu La Rochelle. It consists of six loosely connected stories based on Drieu La Rochelle's experiences as a soldier during World War I. An English translation by Douglas Gallagher was published in 1973.

Plot

So began the battle of Charleroi, Belgium, August 21, 1914, in the first month of the (not so) Great War.  Pierre Drieu La Rochelle, a 21-year-old, inexperienced French officer, was at first exhilarated, a fighting man at last, and then chastened by a shrapnel wound.  Returning to the lines weeks later he was wounded again. After recovering from that he and other French soldiers joined the British in the Dardanelles, from which he was evacuated with amoebic dysentery.  Recovered from that he joined a regiment at the Battle of Verdun to be so seriously wounded he was removed from active service.  This slender volume (212 p) of short-story/memoirs is his looking back at some of the events, the men he knew, the ideas and emotions that swept through him.

Contents
 "The Comedy of Charleroi" ("La comédie de Charleroi")
 "A Living Dog Is Better than a Dead Lion" ("Le chien de l'écriture")
 "Expedition to the Dardanelles" ("Le voyage des Dardanelles")
 "The Infantry Officer" ("Le lieutenant de tirailleurs")
 "The Deserter" ("Le déserteur")
 "End of a War" ("La fin d'une guerre")

References

External links
 The Comedy of Charleroi at the French publisher's website 

1934 short story collections
French-language books
French short story collections
World War I books
World War I fiction
Works by Pierre Drieu La Rochelle
Éditions Gallimard books
Short stories set in Belgium
Short stories set in France